The following is a list of clubs who have played in the Ethiopian Premier League since its formation in 1997 (1990 E.C.) to the current season.

Table 
As of the 2020-21 Season

References 

Ethiopian Premier League
Football in Ethiopia